Explore Park is a  passive recreation facility operated by the Roanoke County Department of Parks, Recreation and Tourism. It includes various restored local historical structures and both hiking and biking trails, along with access to the Roanoke River for recreational use via an external county road. The park is located near the gorge where the Roanoke River leaves the Roanoke Valley.

History 
The River Foundation was formed by Roanoke Valley-area community and business leaders to create a recreational attraction as a hub for tourism in western Virginia. The Virginia General Assembly created the Virginia Recreational Facilities Authority (VRFA) in 1986 to further these ends, and VRFA worked in partnership with the River Foundation. The initial aim was to draw visitors driving on the Blue Ridge Parkway to the Roanoke area. The VRFA acquired the land in 1988 with a  appropriation from the General Assembly and the site became a Virginia state park.

Early ideas included an expanded Mill Mountain Zoo and a historical theme park that would educate visitors on the journey of Lewis and Clark through the American frontier. Roanoke's then city manager Bern Ewart left his post to oversee the park's development.  A lack of investment funds led the park to become a more modest living history museum focused on the early history of Southwest Virginia.  Today's Explore Park began to emerge on September 10, 1991 when reconstruction began on the 1837 Hofauger House of Roanoke County. The River Foundation transferred operating authority to VRFA on July 1, 1994 and Explore Park opened to the public one day later, on July 2, 1994. Between 1991 and 2002 various other historical structures including a working tavern and grist mill were added to the property.

After the plans for Disney's America were unveiled in September 1993, some officials from Explore Park noted striking similarities in proposed themes and rides.

Planned partnership with Virginia Living Histories

On July 24, 2001 Roanoke County made a five-year financial commitment to the park when the State of Virginia eliminated the park's annual appropriation, starting in 2002. Four years later, in June 2005, Virginia Living Histories (VLH) approached VRFA with a plan to develop Explore Park into a major tourist destination. VLH was headed by Larry Vander Maten, a Florida-based developer. Vander Maten hired a team of three consultants, including a former Disney executive, who toured the park in July 2005 to come up with ideas. The trio left after the tour, lunch at a fried pickle restaurant, and meetings with local officials with promises to keep the concepts close to the 1987 master plan.

On October 16, 2007, the Roanoke Times reported that the park would not reopen for the 2008 season in April after the 2007 season ended on November 18. VRFA did not have adequate funding to operate Explore Park beyond the fiscal year ending June 30, 2008, so plans were made to shut down the park and preserve its historical artifacts at the end of the 2007 season instead. The last-day visitors expressed disappointment in the park's planned closure, with then-9-year-old William Cathey saying that he hoped "they are going to build something new that's pretty nice" but he suspected "it's never going to be as good as it is." At the time, it was thought that VLH would decide to proceed with its investment, and the anticipated impact to the public would be minimal, as VLH would have needed to shut down the park in any event starting in 2008 to commence construction. The park transitioned to a passive recreation facility on July 1, 2008, and the park's buildings were shuttered with the exception of the Blue Ridge Parkway Visitor's Center. However, due to the global recession, there were no willing lenders and VLH would exercise its options for two one-year extensions to the review/study period, as capital to begin construction was not available, and VRFA began developing alternative plans.

Near the end of the first extension period, on April 28, 2009, Vander Maten revealed a plan to open a resort named "Blue Ridge America" featuring amenities which include an equestrian center, man-made lakes, retail shops, a golf course, conference center, spa, a system of overhead gondolas to transport visitors around the park, and what was billed as the "longest, highest zip line anywhere." Mr. Vander Maten was unable to raise the necessary funds, and the lease option was allowed to expire in June 2010.

Re-Opening and Adventure Plan
In October 2013, the park re-opened after being purchased by the Virginia Recreational Facilities Authority through a 99-year operating lease to the County of Roanoke. The facility is currently operated by the County's Parks, Recreation and Tourism department as a passive recreation facility. Under Roanoke County administration, annual visitors increased from 13,000 or fewer in 2012 and 2013 to more than 18,000 in 2014, the first full year under County management.

The County is currently seeking to develop the site as an outdoor adventure park with amenities such as cabins, RV parks and zip lines. Roanoke County hired the Philadelphia-based firm of Wallace Roberts & Todd in July 2015 after evaluating four bids to develop a master plan for the next twenty years of park development. Over the next five years, the County intends to embark on a  capital improvement plan to bring utilities to the Park and improve park roads.

Historical Area
The historical area within Explore Park is home to dozens of 18th- and 19th-century buildings relocated from their original locations and reconstructed on-site. Following the 2007 shutdown, the buildings are not normally publicly accessible, but the Mountain Union Church may be rented for special events, including weddings. Other buildings include:

 Frontier Fort — opened in 2004 following an investment of  using logs harvested from the Explore Park property; patterned after a refuge built by Ephraim Vause, Fort Vause, that was built near the present town of Shawsville along the Roanoke River.
 Blacksmith Shop — patterned after historical smithies on the Great Wagon Road
 Hofauger House — originally built in 1837 at the intersection of Ogden Road and Colonial Avenue in Roanoke County.
 Houtz Barn — a German double-crib bank barn originally located on a farm on Mason's Creek near present-day Salem.
 Kemp's Ford School House — a single-room schoolhouse originally located near a ford of the Blackwater River in Franklin County.
 Leninger Cabin — originally built in 2010 for the filming of the movie Alone yet Not Alone and patterned on a log cabin from the 1750s.

Other buildings and structures
Other park features built to accommodate visitors include:

It is the only building which remained open after 2007.

In popular culture
The movie Alone yet Not Alone (2014) was filmed at Explore Park in 2010. The film documents the true historical account of the Leininger sisters, settlers in Pennsylvania who were captured by Delaware Indians following the Penn's Creek massacre on October 16, 1755.

References

Bibliography

External links 

 Roanoke County Parks, Recreation and Tourism: Explore Park

Parks in Roanoke County, Virginia
1985 establishments in Virginia